Christopher Loftus (born October 20, 1984), is an American former soccer player.

Playing career

College level 
Loftus played four years of college soccer for Duke, scoring 24 goals in 80 appearances, and in the USL Premier Development League for Raleigh Elite.

Draft 
He was drafted by the Revolution in the third round of the 2007 MLS Supplemental Draft and signed a developmental contract.

Having failed to make a break into the first team, Loftus was loaned out USL Second Division side New Hampshire Phantoms, making three appearances for the team. His only appearance for the Revolution came in one game in the US Open Cup.  He was waived by New England after the 2007 season.  He signed with Swedish second division side IF Limhamn Bunkeflo in February 2008.

Coaching career
By December 2010, he was working as assistant coach for the Evansville Purple Aces.

References

1984 births
Living people
American soccer players
American expatriate soccer players
Duke Blue Devils men's soccer players
New England Revolution players
North Carolina FC U23 players
Seacoast United Phantoms players
IF Limhamn Bunkeflo (men) players
USL Second Division players
Soccer players from Illinois
USL League Two players
New England Revolution draft picks
Association football forwards